The Battle of Montaigu was a battle on 21 September 1793 during the War in the Vendée, in which the Vendéens attacked general Jean-Michel Beysser's French Republican division. Taken by surprise, this division fought back but lost 400 men, including many captured. Some of these prisoners were summarily executed by the Vendeens and their bodies later found in the castle wells by troops under Jean-Baptiste Kléber. Following this battle Beysser was recalled to Paris, compromised by his Girondin past and condemned to death with the Hébertists on 13 April 1794.

Sources
Yves Gras, La Guerre de Vendée, éditions Economica, 1994, p. 75.

Montaigu
Montaigu
History of Vendée
Montaigu